Paropisthius is a genus of ground beetles in the family Carabidae. There are at least four described species in Paropisthius.

Species
These four species belong to the genus Paropisthius:
 Paropisthius davidis (Fairmaire, 1887)
 Paropisthius indicus (Chaudoir, 1863)
 Paropisthius masuzoi Kasahara, 1989
 Paropisthius unctulus Andrewes, 1932

References

Nebriinae